Knob, Arkansas is an unincorporated community in Clay County, Arkansas.  It is the location of the Knob School-Masonic Lodge, which is listed on the National Register of Historic Places.

References

Unincorporated communities in Clay County, Arkansas
Unincorporated communities in Arkansas